Events from 2022 in Christmas Island.

Incumbents 

 Administrative head: Natasha Griggs

Events 
Ongoing – COVID-19 pandemic in Oceania; COVID-19 pandemic in Christmas Island

 6 March – Christmas Island reports its first case of COVID-19, in a traveler from Australia.

Weather 

 2021–22 Australian region cyclone season
 Tropical Cyclone Paddy

References 

Years of the 21st century in Christmas Island
Christmas Island